Shree Agrasen College, established in 1995, is the general degree college in Dalkhola, in the Uttar Dinajpur district. It offers undergraduate courses in arts and commerce.

Departments

Honours courses
Bengali (Hons) -119
History (Hons) - 58
English (Hons)	- 58
Political Science (Hons) - 43
Sociology (Hons) - 43
Hindi (Hons) - 25
Accountancy (Hons) - 43

General courses
B. A. (Gen) - 1470
B. Sc (Gen) - 30
B.Com. (Gen) - 300

Subjects taught on B.A. (General) :- Elective Bengali, Elective English, Elective Hindi, Elective Sanskrit, Elective Urdu, Political Science, History, Sociology, Education, Philosophy, Physical Education, Geography, 
Subject taught on Mother Indian Language: Compulsory Bengali, Compulsory Hindi, Compulsory Urdu, Compulsory English, Alternative English.
Subjects taught on B.Sc. (Gen):- Physics, Mathematics, Chemistry
Subjects taught on B.Com. (Gen):-Financial Accounting, Corporate Accounting, Business Mathematics & Statistics, Business Regulatory, Frame Work, Company Law, Money and financial system, Business Communication, Information Technology       .

Facilities
The Mahavidyalaya has a LCD projector and computers for the faculty and students besides various Maps and Charts for imparting Teaching.

Library
There are about 10000 books in the library with several reference books on different subjects. There is reading room for teachers and also for students.

Student profile
student Profile : 2007-08

No. of  students (year wise ) with Honours break - up

(Based on Academic session 2007–2008)

B.A. First year  (Hons) in Bengali-     71

B.A. First year  (Hons) inHistory-      41

B.A. First year (Hons) inEnglish-      27

B.Com. First year(Hons) in Accountancy- 16

B.A. 2nd year    (Hons) in Bengali-     71

B.A. 2nd year    (Hons) in History-     38

B.Com.2nd year   (Hons) in Accountancy- 17

B.A. 3rd year    (Hons) in Bengali -    42

B.A. 3rd year    (Hons) in History-     13

B.Com. 3rd year  (Hons) in       -      11

Number of students year wise on General Course

Total No. of students :- 1053

Other achievements
The Mahavidyalaya had received award in 2001 from youth parliament competition and had stood 1st position in West Bengal. The Mahavidyalaya was awarded by National Business Council from Delhi in 2004.

The Mahavidyalaya had given Training to the poor students as self-employment programme on RSVY SCHEME IN 2004.

Presently the Mahavidyalaya has been giving coaching for entry in services for S.C., S.C. and Minority Communities and also remedial coaching to the B.A./B.Com. Students of this Mahavidyalaya on U.G.C. scheme.

See also

References

External links
Shree Agrasen Mahavidyalaya
University of Gour Banga
University Grants Commission
National Assessment and Accreditation Council

Colleges affiliated to University of Gour Banga
Academic institutions formerly affiliated with the University of North Bengal
Universities and colleges in Uttar Dinajpur district
Educational institutions established in 1995
Memorials to Agrasen
1995 establishments in West Bengal